Panglima is a military title used in Indonesia and Malaysia, and historically in the Philippines. It means 'a commander of a body of troops'. In the past it is used to call some prominent military leaders in several kingdoms, such as Panglima Polem from Aceh. In modern times it is reserved for the chiefs of the armed forces of Indonesia and Malaysia and some other posts.

Use in Indonesia

Panglima Tertinggi Angkatan Bersenjata Republik Indonesia

As stipulated in article 10 of Indonesian Constitution, the President of Indonesia is the Supreme Commander of Indonesian Armed Forces. Essentially it is parallel to the title 'Commander-in-Chief' in other countries, e.g. the United States.

During the Old Order era, this title is included into many honorific titles that were often mentioned each time Sukarno's name was written or read in speeches, edicts, or news.

Panglima TNI
In Indonesian National Armed Forces  the highest position overseeing the three branches - Army, Navy, Air Force - is called  ('Commander of the Indonesian National Armed Forces'). Before the separation of the National Police from the Armed forces in 2000, the Armed Forces consisted of four branches. The Armed Forces were named Angkatan Bersenjata Republik Indonesia, which comprised TNI and the Police. The commander of the Armed Forces was called  accordingly, or usually known with the acronym .

According to the revised Constitution  is appointed by the President after confirmed by DPR. Before the Constitution was amended in 2002, the President had the prerogative right to appoint or dismiss the 'Panglima' at his pleasure.

Panglima Besar

The honorific title , meaning 'Grand Commander' was bestowed informally upon Sudirman, the first Commander of the Armed Forces and legendary leader of guerilla war during Indonesian National Revolution (1945–1949).

Other military uses

Beside the use for 'Panglima TNI', the title 'Panglima' is also used for many formations within the Armed Forces.

The commander of Kostrad, a formation within the Indonesian Army, is called . One of such notable  is the first, Suharto, who later became a President of Indonesia (1968–1998), and the second, Umar Wirahadikusumah, who became Vice President of Indonesia (1983–1988).

There are 15 Kodam, each with one Pangdam.

Each commander of the three Fleet Commands is given title 'Panglima'.

Similar to the Navy, each commander of the three Air Force Operations Commands is also given title 'Panglima'.

Past usage
Upon the formation of the Fourth Working Cabinet (19 November 1963), the title 'Panglima' was used for the commander of each branch of Indonesian Armed Forces. They were also members of the Cabinet. Therefore, they were given the title  (Minister), appointed directly by the President. As such, their titles were: 
 Minister/Commander of the Army (abbreviated ) 
 Minister/Commander of the Navy (abbreviated ) 
 Minister/Commander of the Air Force (abbreviated ) 
 Minister/Commander of the Police (abbreviated )

Use in Malaysia

Panglima Angkatan Tentera
In Malaysian Armed Forces the highest position overseeing the branches - Army, Navy, Air Force - is called  (in official English translation: Chief of Defence Force).

Panglima Tentera
Each branch of Malaysian Armed Forces has a Panglima at its head. Each of them also has a deputy commander, called  (Deputy Chief).

Other uses
The word 'Panglima' is used for several titles in the orders and decorations of Malaysia, such as Panglima Mangku Negara (P.M.N), Panglima Setia Mahkota (P.S.M.), Panglima Jasa Negara (P.J.N.), and Panglima Setia Diraja (P.S.D.).

PASKAL, Royal Malaysian Navy's special operation force, is also known as Panglima Hitam.

Other usage
 Panglima Estino - 5th class municipality in the province of Sulu, Philippines.
 Panglima Sugala - 3rd class municipality in the province of Tawi-Tawi, Philippines.
 RSS Panglima - was the first ship of the Republic of Singapore Navy.  Naval Military Experts Institute, co-located in Changi Naval Base, is named RSS Panglima in honour of the first ship of the navy.

See also
 Indonesian National Armed Forces
 Malaysian Armed Forces
 Orders, decorations, and medals of Malaysia

Notes

References
 Bachtiar, Harsja W. Siapa Dia?: Perwira Tinggi Tentara Nasional Indonesia Angkatan Darat (Who is He?: Senior Officers of the Indonesian Army), Penerbit Djambatan, Jakarta, 1988, 
 Poerwadarminta, W. J. S.  Kamus Umum Bahasa Indonesia, Balai Pustaka, 1986
 Sekretariat Negara Republik Indonesia. 30 Tahun Indonesia Merdeka (30 Years of Indonesian Independence) 1965–1973, 6th reprint, 1985

External links
 Official Website of TNI
 Official Website of the Department of Defense
 Malaysian Armed Forces Headquarters Website
 Royal Malaysian awards and decorations

Malay language
Military of Indonesia
Military history of Indonesia
Military of Malaysia